Salvio Lemos (born 25 June 1933) is a Brazilian modern pentathlete. He competed at the 1956 Summer Olympics.

References

1933 births
Living people
Brazilian male modern pentathletes
Olympic modern pentathletes of Brazil
Modern pentathletes at the 1956 Summer Olympics
20th-century Brazilian people